Brookfield Academy is a non-sectarian, private PreK–12 school in Brookfield, Wisconsin. The school opened on September 10, 1962, in a converted ranch-style house. The Academy has expanded over the years with new buildings and more teachers and students. In 2014, the Academy had 97 faculty members and more than 860 students on a  campus. Brookfield Academy has 18 Advanced Placement courses for students and numerous other clubs and activities.

History
In the early 1960s, a few Milwaukee area families gathered to discuss starting their own school. The founders purchased a ranch-style house in Brookfield and converted the house into a school. The school opened on September 10, 1962, with 33 students in grades 1–8 and six teachers.

The second year, the Academy had 65 students and eight teachers. In 1964, three new classrooms were added and in 1967, a second classroom building called Freedom Hall was built to house the Upper School program, called the College Prep School. The Academy had its first senior class graduation in 1971. More new buildings have been built since.

In 1995, the Academy purchased a  farm on the west side of Brookfield Road and the land was developed into an athletic complex and a home for the College Prep School. In 2014, the Academy had 97 faculty members and more than 860 students. The campus now occupies . Brookfield Academy has 18 Advanced Placement courses for students. Opportunities include performing arts, fine arts, music, writing, volunteer service, club activities, and an athletic program.

See also
Brookfield, Wisconsin
Waukesha County, Wisconsin

References

External links
 

Private elementary schools in Wisconsin
Private middle schools in Wisconsin
Private high schools in Wisconsin
Educational institutions established in 1962
Schools in Waukesha County, Wisconsin
1962 establishments in Wisconsin